Lipocrea is a genus of orb-weaver spiders first described by Tamerlan Thorell in 1878.

Species 
 it contains four species:
Lipocrea diluta Thorell, 1887 — Myanmar to Indonesia
Lipocrea epeiroides (O. Pickard-Cambridge, 1872) — Italy (Sardinia, Sicily), Greece, Cyprus, Turkey, Israel, Yemen, India
Lipocrea fusiformis (Thorell, 1877) — India to Japan, Philippines, Indonesia (Sulawesi)
Lipocrea longissima (Simon, 1881) — Central, East, Southern Africa

References 

Araneomorphae genera
Araneidae